Penicillium sabulosum is an anamorph species of fungus in the genus Penicillium.

References 

sabulosum
Fungi described in 1985